James Earl Jackson (July 28, 1956 – June 17, 2008) was an American freestyle wrestler, who competed at the 1976 Summer Olympics. He was born in Windsor, Ontario, Canada. Jackson was a graduate of Ottawa Hills High School in Grand Rapids, Michigan. At the 1979 Pan American Games he finished first in the freestyle unlimited category. At Oklahoma State, he was a three-time All-American champion at heavyweight. Jackson was briefly a professional wrestler in Mid-South Wrestling.

References

External links
Sports-Reference

1956 births
2008 deaths
Canadian emigrants to the United States
Canadian male sport wrestlers
Sportspeople from Windsor, Ontario
Sportspeople from Grand Rapids, Michigan
Black Canadian sportspeople
Oklahoma State Cowboys wrestlers
Wrestlers at the 1976 Summer Olympics
Olympic wrestlers of the United States
American male sport wrestlers
Pan American Games gold medalists for the United States
Pan American Games medalists in wrestling
American male professional wrestlers
Wrestlers at the 1979 Pan American Games
Medalists at the 1979 Pan American Games